Hicks, also spelled Hickes, is a surname.
See also Hix.

Surname

A (... Hicks) 
 Aaron Hicks (born 1989), American professional baseball center fielder 
 Adam Hicks (born 1992), American actor, rapper, singer, and songwriter
 Akiem Hicks (born 1989), American football defensive end
 Albert W. Hicks (1820-1860), American triple murderer, and one of the last persons executed for piracy in the US
 Aline Elizabeth Black Hicks (1906–1974), African-American schoolteacher who filed a salary discrimination case
 Amy Hicks (1877–1953), American suffragist
 Andrew Hicks (born 1988), Papua New Guinean cricketer
 Andy Hicks (born 1973), English snooker player
 Anthony Hicks (1943–2010), Welsh musicologist, music critic, editor, and writer
 Artis Hicks, American football player

B 
 Baptist Hicks, 1st Viscount Campden (1551–1629), English politician
 Barbara Hicks, British actress
 Beatrice Hicks, American engineer
 Benjamin Hicks, 18th-century New York assemblyman
 Betty Hicks, American golfer
 Bill Hicks (1961–1994), American comedian
 Bobby Hicks (born 1933), American bluegrass fiddler and professional musician 
 Bonny Hicks (1968–1997), Singaporean model and novelist
 Brandon Hicks, professional baseball player

C 
 Catherine Hicks, American actress
 Charles R. Hicks (1767–1827), one of the most important Cherokee leaders in the early 19th century
 Chris Hicks (rugby league), Australian rugby league footballer
 Chris Hicks (record executive), American record company executive
 Chris Hicks (rugby league), Australian former professional rugby league footballer
 Chuck Hicks, American actor and stuntman
 Clifford Hicks (disambiguation), several people named Cliff or Clifford
 Colin Hicks (born 1941), leader of the band Colin Hicks & The Cabin Boys
 Courtney Hicks (born 1995), American figure skater
 Curry Hicks (1885–1964), American football coach, athletic director, and professor of physical education

D 
 Dan Hicks (disambiguation), several people
 David Hicks (disambiguation), various people
 Dolores Hicks (born 1938), American better known under stage name Dolores Hart, former actress who joined convent and became a nun
 Doug Hicks, Canadian hockey player
 Dwight Hicks, American football player
 Dwone Hicks, American football player
 Dylan Hicks, American musician and singer-songwriter

E 
 Edna Hicks, American blues musician
 Edward Hicks (1780–1849), American Quaker and naive painter
 Edward Hicks (bishop) (1843–1919), British Anglican author and Bishop of Lincoln
 Emmett R. Hicks (1854–1925), American lawyer
 Edwin Hicks (1830–1902), New York politician
 Elias Hicks (1748–1830), American Quaker minister
 Elijah Hicks (born 1999), American football player
 Ellis Hicks (1315–1390), English knight
 Eric Hicks (disambiguation), several people
 Esther Hicks, American medium and motivational speaker

F -G - H - I
 Faion Hicks (born 2000), American football player
 Frederick Hicks (disambiguation), several people
 George Hickes (disambiguation), several people
 George Hicks (disambiguation), several people
 Granville Hicks (1901–1982)
 Greg Hicks (born 1953), English actor

H 
 Helen Hicks, American golfer
 Henry Hicks (disambiguation)
 Hilly Hicks, American actor
 Hinda Hicks, British singer
 Hope Hicks (born 1988), American public relations executive and former White House publicity czar under Trump

I 
 India Hicks, British fashion model, daughter of Lady Pamela Hicks

J

Ja -  Ji 
 Jack Hicks, constructionist steel sculptor
 Jane Martha Hicks Beach (1802-1882), an early English photographer
 Jessie Hicks (born 1971), American former professional basketball player
 Jim Hicks (1940–2020), American professional baseball player

Jo 
 Jodie Hicks (born 1997), Australian rules footballer 
 Joe Hicks Tipton (1922-1994), American professional baseball player
 John Hickes (politician) (fl. 1380–1388), English politician and spicer
 John Hickes (minister) (1633–1685), English nonconformist minister
 John Hicks (disambiguation), several people
 Jon Hicks (disambiguation), several people
 Jordan Hicks (born 1992), American football middle linebacker 
 Jordan Hicks (baseball) (born 1996), American professional baseball pitcher 
 Jose Luis Romero Hicks, Mexican politician
 Joshua Hicks (born 1991), Australian rower

Ju 
 Juan Carlos Romero Hicks, Mexican politician

K - L 
 Karen Hicks, American Democratic Party operative
 Katherine Hicks, Australian actress

La 
 Lancelot Hickes (1884–1965), Second World War British Army major-general
 Larry R. Hicks (born 1943), American Senior United States District Judge of the United States District Court for the District of Nevada
 Larry S. Hicks, Republican member of the Wyoming Senate, representing the 11th district since 2011
 Laurence Henry Hicks (1912–1997), Australian composer

Le - Lo
 Levin Hicks Campbell (born 1927), a Senior United States Circuit Judge of the U.S. Court of Appeals for the First Circuit
 Louise Day Hicks (1916–2003), American politician and lawyer

M

Ma 
 Margaret Hicks, artist of miniatures
 Margaret Hicks (architect), American architect
 Martin Hicks (born 1957), English former football defender 
 Maurice Hicks, American football player
 Merv Hicks, Welsh rugby league footballer

Mi - Mo
 Michael Hicks (disambiguation), several people
 Michele Hicks (born 1948), English actress
 Moses Hicks Grinnell (1803–1877), United States Congressman representing New York

N - O 
 Nat Hicks (born 1845), an American baseball player who was the first catcher to stand behind the batter 
 Nicola Hicks (born 1960), English sculptor

P - Q
 Lady Pamela Hicks, daughter of Louis Mountbatten 
 Paula Hicks-Hudson (born 1951), American politician
 Peggy Glanville-Hicks (1912–1990), Australian composer
 Phil Hicks (born 1953), former American basketball player

R  - S  - T
 Ramón Angel María Hicks Cáceres (born 1959), Paraguayan former football winger
 Ratcliffe Hicks (1843–1906), American industrialist and state legislator
 René Hicks, American comedian
 Reni Hicks (born 1998), Australian rules footballer
 Robert Hicks (disambiguation), several people
 Ron Hicks, American politician from Missouri
 Ronald Aldon Hicks (born 1967), American Roman Catholic Church auxiliary bishop of the Archdiocese of Chicago
 Rosalind Hicks, British literary guardian and the only child of author, Agatha Christie
 Russell Hicks (1895-1957), American film actor

S  
 Scott Hicks, Australian film director
 Seymour Hicks, English actor/manager
 Sheila Hicks, American textile artist
 Skilyr Hicks, American musical artist
 Skip Hicks, American football player
 Stephen Hicks (born 1960), Canadian-American philosopher 
 Stuart Hicks (born 1967), English former professional football defender

T 
 Taral Hicks, American singer and actress
 Taylor Hicks, American singer
 Thomas Hicks (disambiguation), several people names Thomas or Tom
 Tim Hicks, American singer
 Tim Hicks (American football), American football player
 Tom Hicks, American private equity investor and sports team owner 
 Tony Hicks (born 1945), guitarist, singer and songwriter of The Hollies

U - V- W - X - Y - Z

V 
 Victor Hicks, American football player

W 
 Whitehead Hicks, the 42nd Mayor of New York City from 1766 to 1776
 William Hicks (disambiguation), several people called Bill or William

Z 
  Zachary Hickes (1739–1771), Royal Navy lieutenant, second-in-command on James Cook's first voyage of discovery to the Pacific

Fictional characters
 Brian Hicks, private military contractor in the game Army of Two
 Billy Hicks, a character in St. Elmo's Fire
 Chick Hicks, an anthropomorphic race car from Pixar's animated feature film Cars
 Dante Hicks, in the films Clerks and Clerks II
 Corporal Dwayne Hicks, United States Colonial Marine in the movie Aliens
 Gilly Hicks, fictional founder of the Abercrombie & Fitch brand of the same name
 Steve Hicks, one of the title characters in the 2005 American romantic comedy movie Adam & Steve

See also
 Peggy Glanville-Hicks, American composer
 Lancelot Joynson-Hicks, 3rd Viscount Brentford, British politician
 Hix (disambiguation)

English-language surnames
Surnames from given names